Roseateles aquatilis is a Gram-negative, oxidase-positive, catalase-negative, aerobic, rod-shaped bacterium with a single polar flagellum from the genus Roseateles, which was isolated from industrial water and fresh water. Colonies of R. aquatilis are clear.

References

External links
Type strain of Roseateles aquatilis at BacDive -  the Bacterial Diversity Metadatabase

Comamonadaceae
Bacteria described in 2008